Tricholoma fumosoluteum is a mushroom of the agaric genus Tricholoma. First described by Charles Horton Peck in 1875 as Agaricus fumosoluteus, it was transferred to the genus Tricholoma by Pier Andrea Saccardo in 1887.

See also
List of North American Tricholoma

References

External links
 

Fungi described in 1875
Fungi of North America
fumosoluteum
Taxa named by Charles Horton Peck